List of active ships of the Japan Maritime Self-Defense Force is a list of ships in active service with the Japan Maritime Self-Defense Force.
The JMSDF is one of the world's largest navies and the second largest navy in Asia in terms of fleet tonnage. As of 2022, the JMSDF operates a total of 155 vessels (including minor auxiliary vessels), including; four helicopter destroyers (or helicopter carriers), 36 destroyers, 10 small destroyers (or frigates), two frigates, six destroyer escorts (or corvettes), 22 attack submarines, 30 mine countermeasure vessels, six patrol vessels, three landing ship tanks, 8 training vessels and a fleet of various auxiliary ships.

As of 2013, a procurement list added to the current National Defense Program Guidelines (NDPG) has revealed that, among other things, an additional 48 escort vessels of various classes are planned to be added to the MSDF fleet in the 2020s. In addition, as of 7 July 2013, it was being reported that plans were under way to procure two more Aegis equipped destroyers in order to bolster ongoing BMD efforts, the first to be contracted for in fiscal year 2015 and the other in fiscal year 2016.

Submarine fleet

Submarines

Surface fleet

Helicopter destroyers (de facto helicopter carrier/light aircraft carrier) - DDH/CVL 
Officially classed as "helicopter destroyers", these vessels have a full-length flight deck helicopter carrier configuration

Landing ships

Destroyers - DDG/DD
The JMSDF uses the official term Destroyers despite some larger ships being analogous to cruisers and smaller vessels being analogues of frigates by most international classifications.

Frigate Multi-Purpose/Mine - FFM

Destroyer escorts - DE

Mine countermeasure vessels

Patrol vessels

Training vessels

Auxiliary fleet

Replenishment ships

Miscellaneous

Future JMSDF vessels

Authorized projects
Authorized projects for the Japanese Maritime Self-Defense Force include the ongoing construction of an improved AIP-type non-nuclear attack submarine class, the recapitalization of the JMSDF's frigate fleet units, and the acquisition of a pair of JMSDF-owned oil tankers and up to four amphibious tansports, as well as the pending construction of a dozen next-generation offshore patrol vessels (OPV) and two "Aegis system equipped ships" (ASEV) to provide dedicated sea-based ballistic missile defense (BMD) coverage of the Japanese home islands to replace the cancelled Aegis Ashore land-based BMD system.

29SS submarines

This submarine class has a non-nuclear air-independent propulsion (AIP) propulsion plant using improved lithium-ion batteries for enhanced silencing and operational flexibility.  These submarines will also have improved sonar and weapons systems. The lead ship Taigei will serve as a test bed for the rest of the class, allowing more rapid technical upgrades to the other submarines within this class.

30FFM frigates

In August 2017, the Acquisition, Technology & Logistics Agency (ATLA) selected Mitsubishi Heavy Industries (MHI) and Mitsui Engineering and Shipbuilding (MES) as the prime contractor and subcontractor to construct the frigate. In addition, the agency also selected a completely new design of the vessel (30DX). The new ship class is set to replace the s and s.

Amphibious transport vessels

At a press conference held on February 16, 2021, Defense Minister Nobuo Kishi announced that the Japan Self-Defense Force (JSDF) established a joint amphibious unit equipped with three new transport ships by 2024. Although the Japan Maritime Self-Defense Force (JMSDF) has been basically responsible for the operation of the vessels, these vessels will be operated by a joint unit as the focus is on supporting the Japan Ground Self-Defense Force (JGSDF) and other forces operating in remote Southwest Islands, including Okinawa. The JSDF activated Japan's first marine unit since World War II on April 7, 2018, and the marines of the Amphibious Rapid Deployment Brigade (ARDB) are trained to counter invaders from occupying Japanese islands along the edge of the East China Sea.

Next-generation offshore patrol vessels (OPV)

On 30 June 2022, the Japan Ministry of Defense (MOD) announced the construction of 12 offshore patrol vessels (OPV) (pictured) for the Japanese Maritime Self-Defense Force (JMSDF) at a cost of ¥ 9 billion ($66 million USD) per ship. Japan Marine United Corporation (JMU) is the prime contractor for this program with Mitsubishi Heavy Industries (MHI) chosen to be the subcontractor.  Both JMU and MHI as well as Mitsui Engineering & Shipbuilding had submitted preliminary designs for the proposed next-generation OPVs.

Aegis system equipped ships (ASEV)

In 2020, Japanese Defense Minister Nobuo Kishi announced plans to build 2 new Aegis destroyers (pictured) to replace its scrapped land-based Aegis Ashore ballistic missile interceptors program.  On August 31, 2022, the Japan Ministry of Defense announced that JMSDF will operate two "Aegis system equipped ships" (イージス・システム搭載艦 in Japanese) to replace its earlier cancellation of the Aegis Ashore program, commissioning one ship by the end of fiscal year 2027, and the other by the end of FY2028. The budget for design and other related expenses are to be submitted in the form of “item requests”, without specific amounts, and the initial procurement of the lead items are expected to clear legislation by FY2023. Construction is to begin in the following year of FY2024.

Proposed projects

Given the various maritime-related territorial disputes and expanding operational requirements (pictured), the Japanese Maritime Self-Defense (JMSDF) has shown increased interest in augmenting its amphibious lift and expeditionary capabilities. Consequently, several Japanese defense firms such as Japan Marine United Corporation (JMU) and Mitsui Engineering & Shipbuilding (MES) have proposed amphibious warfare options at such industry trade shows as the Maritime Air Systems & Technologies (MAST) and Defence and Security Equipment International (DSEI) exhibits.  Also, on March 4, 2014, Japan and the United States announced a bilateral research project on a LCS-style warship pursuant to the Mutual Defense Assistance Act.

Amphibious assault ships (LHD)

In 2014, Japanese Defense Minister Itsunori Onodera expressed the intention of buying one amphibious assault ship (LHD) from the United States to provide more amphibious capabilities than the current Osumi class landing ships. The  is most likely candidate for acquisition.

JMU design concept
During the annual Defence and Security Equipment International (DSEI) tradeshow held 18–19 November 2019 in Chiba, Japan, the Japan Marine United Corporation (JMU) unveiled its proposed design for a big-deck multi-purpose LHD-type amphibious assault ship for the Japan Maritime Self-Defense Force.  The vessel’s design features a floodable well deck for embarking two LCAC air-cushion landing craft plus 20 AAV7A1 amphibious assault vehicles. Its full-length flight deck boasts five marked landing spots for helicopters or MV-22B tiltrotors. Two below-deck hangars have space for five more rotorcraft. The vessel has a 500-person crew and an embarked unit of 500 marines.  The JMU concept art displayed three RIM-116 Rolling Airframe Missile (RAM) SeaRAM launchers located before and aft of the ship's  island superstructure, as well as a Mk 15 Phalanx 20mm-Vulcan cannon-armed Close-in Weapon System (CIWS) on the forward deck.

A JMU representative told Jane's 360 that while the Japan Maritime Self-Defense Force did not have a current requirement for an LHD-type amphibious assault ship of any kind to join the JMSDF's Self Defense Fleet, the Japan Marine United Corporation still expected the JMSDF to eventually issue such a requirement in the near future, with the JMU design as an alternative to a foreign design.

MES design concept
At the Maritime Air Systems & Technologies (MAST) 2017 naval defense exhibition held in Tokyo, Mitsui Engineering & Shipbuilding (MES) unveiled a new LHD-type amphibious assault ship for the Japan Maritime Self-Defense Force. MES drew on its experience from constructing and delivering the Osumi and Shimokita tank landing ships (LSTs) to the JMSDF when designing the new LHD. According to Mistui spokesmen, the main missions of the proposed LHD vessel is island defense as well as humanitarian assistance/disaster relief (HA/DR) operations, with the Japan Maritime Self-Defense Force (JMSDF) is reportedly looking to boost its amphibious capabilities in order to protect its Southern Islands.

Mitsui's proposed LHD vessel is designed for large-scale transportation of Landing Craft Air Cushion (LCAC) hovercraft, main battle tanks (MBTs), vehicles, cargo, and equipment, with multi-mission features.  Its flight deck LHD has five helicopter spots and a hangar large enough to large helicopters such as the CH-47 Chinook tandem rotor heavy-lift helicopters. Its well deck is large enough to accommodate two LCACs, and it can store at least 24 assault amphibious vehicles (AAVs) on two decks.

The maximum complement of the vessel is 200 people including embarked troops. Mitsui's LHD is fitted with a forward Phalanx CIWS gun mount and a SeaRAM launcher at the stern. There are two shafts and two rudders, plus two bow thrusters. There is a main elevator for helicopters aft and a smaller one for stores and equipment forward near the island superstructure. Overall, the Mitsui LHD concept to the French Navy's Mistral-class LHDs.

Amphibious transport dock (LPD)

At the Maritime Air Systems & Technologies (MAST) 2017 naval defense exhibition held in Tokyo, Mitsui Engineering & Shipbuilding (MES) unveiled a new amphibious transport dock (LPD) concept. According to Mistui spokesmen, the main missions of the proposed LPD vessel is island defense as well as humanitarian assistance/disaster relief (HA/DR) operations, with the Japan Maritime Self-Defense Force (JMSDF) is reportedly looking to boost its amphibious capabilities in order to protect its Southern Islands.

The proposed MES LPD design concept has an aft flight deck with two helicopter spots and a hangar large enough to receive two V-22 Osprey tilt-rotor aircraft and a small size VTOL unmanned aerial vehicle (UAV) similar in size to the MQ-8B Fire Scout. Beneath the flight deck is a well deck large enough to accommodate two Landing Craft Air Cushion (LCAC) hovercraft. Up to 40 AAV, MBT, and APC vehicles can be carried on two lower decks within the ship. The maximum complement of the vessel is 200 people, including embarked troops. The LPD is fitted with a forward Phalanx CIWS gun mount and a SeaRAM launcher on top of the helicopter hangar. The vessel has two shafts and two rudders, as well as two bow thrusters, and also features two retractable fin stabilizers.

Mobile landing platform (MLP)

At the Maritime Air Systems & Technologies (MAST) 2017 naval defense exhibition held in Tokyo, Mitsui Engineering & Shipbuilding (MES) unveiled its Mobile Landing Platform (MLP) concept designed for large scale transportation of Landing Craft Air Cushion (LCAC) hovercraft, main battle tanks (MBTs), vehicles, cargo, and other equipment, with multi-mission and modular features. In addition to its aviation operations and amphibious capabilities, this MLP can act as an offshore base. The Japan Maritime Self-Defense Force is reportedly looking to boost its amphibious capabilities in order to protect its Southern Islands.

The MES's overall MLP design combines the aviation facilities of the U.S. Navy's Lewis B. Puller-class expeditionary mobile base ships with the extensive amphibious and expeditionary capabilities of the Montford Point-class expeditionary transfer dock vessels. There are four helicopter spots on the flight deck, but no helicopter hanger, with an elevator for stores and equipment next to spot #2. There is also a ramp allowing vehicles access between the two main decks.

33DD destroyers

The 33DD (also known as DDR or Destroyer Revolution) was a Japanese destroyer proposed for the Japan Maritime Self-Defense Force. The tentative name of the class, 33 DD, is derived from an estimate that it would be budgeted in the Japanese era of Heisei 33 (2021).

High Speed Multi-hull Vessel Optimization (HSMVO)

The joint HSMVO research is conducted by the Acquisition, Technology & Logistics Agency (ATLA) and the Naval Surface Warfare Center Carderock Division of the US Navy. Also known as the Future Multi Purpose Trimaran concept, the HSMVO design concept is based on the Independence-class littoral combat ship with its distinctive trimaran hull design, modular mission capabilities, and aluminum construction (pictured).  The mission capabilities of the concept includes mine countermeasure (MCM), humanitarian assistance and disaster recover (HADR), and offshore patrol/special ops. Likewise, each configuration will consist of different weapons, equipment, and supplies. 

ATLA unveiled the HSMVO trimaran warship concept model at the Japanese defense trade-show MAST Asia 2017. According to Navy Recognition website, the project is set to end in 2018 and the JMSDF would ultimately decide whether to adopt the concept for development or not. To date, no decision has been made regarding the future acquisition and construction of warships based on the HSMVO design concept.

References

External links
 
 
Website on the Imperial Japanese Navy: JMSDF vessels

Bibliography

 
Lists of ships of Japan